Orrible is a British television sitcom produced by the BBC. Broadcast in 2001, it was written by and starred Johnny Vaughan. Vaughan stars as a cheeky chappy taxi-cab driver and wannabe small-time criminal in Acton (west London). Despite the BBC being confident and heavily promoting the series, it was panned by critics for the script and Vaughan's acting ability. It achieved very low viewing figures and ran for one series, and has never been repeated by the BBC. "Ultimately, it was shit" said Vaughan in a 2004 interview in The Stage. James Buckley made his acting debut playing Sean's son (and Paul's godson) in the sixth episode, Two Men and a Bastard

In 2017, Vaughan approached the BBC with prospect to repeat the series either via BBC Four or on-line channel BBC Three to mark its 15th Anniversary, both with a sense of irony but also to potentially gain it new recognition. The BBC did not pursue Vaughan's suggestion.

Cast
 Johnny Vaughan – Paul Clark
 Ricky Grover – Sean
 Angel Coulby – Shiv Clark
 Di Botcher – Di Clark
 Lee Oakes – Lee
 William Boyde – Tim
 Clint Dyer – Noel

References

External links

2001 British television series debuts
2001 British television series endings
2000s British sitcoms
BBC television sitcoms
Television shows set in London